Rosa 'Duet' is a pink blend Hybrid tea rose cultivar, bred by hybridizer Herbert Swim in 1960 and   introduced into the United States by Armstrong roses in 1960. 'Duet' was named an All-America Rose Selections winner in 1961. The stock parents are Rosa 'Fandango' and Rosa 'Roundelay'.
 
'Duet' is a medium-tall upright shrub, 4 to 6 ft (121-182 cm) in height with a 2 to 3 ft (60-91 cm) spread. Blooms are 4-5  in (10-12  cm) in diameter, with 26 to 40 petals. The rose has a mild fragrance.  'Duet's flowers are notable for their contrasting colors of pale pink on the upper surface with a hint of coral, and a reverse of dark purple-pink. Blooms are large, high-centered and ruffled and grow singly or in small clusters. The shrub blooms without interruption from spring through early winter. The leaves are medium-green, glossy and disease resistant. 'Duet' grows best in USDA zone 7 and warmer.

Awards
 Baden Baden rose trials, Germany, 1959
 All-America Rose Selections winner, USA, (1961)

See also
Garden roses
Rose Hall of Fame
List of Award of Garden Merit roses

Notes

References

 
Duet
Products introduced in 1960